Shahrak-e Sarkhadh (also Romanized as Shahrak-e Sarkhādh; also known as Sarkhā, Shahrak-e Sarkhā, and Sorkhā) is a village in Isin Rural District, in the Central District of Bandar Abbas County, Hormozgan Province, Iran. At the 2006 census, its population was 105, in 33 families.

References 

Populated places in Bandar Abbas County